Jaimy Brute (born 15 April 1999) is a Dutch football player. He plays for Sparta Rotterdam and their youth team.

Club career
He made his Eerste Divisie debut for Sparta Rotterdam on 7 September 2018 in a game against FC Eindhoven as a 75th-minute substitute for Gregor Breinburg.

References

External links
 

1999 births
Living people
Dutch footballers
Association football midfielders
Sparta Rotterdam players
Eerste Divisie players
Tweede Divisie players